The XIII Venice Challenge Save Cup is a professional tennis tournament played on clay courts. It is the 2nd edition of the men's tournament which was part of the 2015 ATP Challenger Tour. It took place in Mestre, Italy between 1 and 7 June 2015.

Singles main-draw entrants

Seeds

1 Rankings as of May 25, 2015.

Other entrants
The following players received wildcards into the singles main draw:
  Matteo Berrettini
  Edoardo Eremin
  Gianluigi Quinzi
  Matteo Viola

The following player received entry as alternate:
  José Hernández

The following players received entry from the qualifying draw:
  Cristian Garín
  Calvin Hemery
  Mitchell Krueger
  Stefano Napolitano

Doubles main-draw entrants

Seeds

1 Rankings as of May 25, 2015.

Other entrants
The following pairs received wildcards into the doubles main draw:
  Sam Barnett /  Jesse Witten
  Matteo Berrettini /  Gianluigi Quinzi
  Edoardo Eremin /  Pietro Rondoni

Champions

Singles

  Máximo González def.  Jozef Kovalík, 6–1, 6–3

Doubles

  Flavio Cipolla /  Potito Starace def.  Facundo Bagnis /  Sergio Galdós, 5–7, 7–6(7–3), [10–4]

External links
 Official website

Venice Challenge Save Cup
Venice Challenge Save Cup
June 2015 sports events in Italy